Revue du monde musulman (French: Review of the Muslim World) was a French magazine headquartered in Paris, France. The magazine featured articles about the events in the Islamic countries. It existed between 1906 and 1926.

History and profile
Revue du monde musulman was launched in Paris in 1926. The first issue appeared in November that year. The publisher was Ernest Leroux, and the founder and editor was Alfred Le Chatelier. The major topic for the magazine was the developments and social and educational situation in the Muslim countries. 

The contributors were mainly French scholars who studied Islam, but Muslim authors also contributed to Revue du monde musulman. From 1911 the board of editors included L. Bouvat, Antoine Cabaton, H. Cordier, O. Houdas, Clément Huart, Louis Massignon, J. Vinson and A. Visière. During World War I the magazine was published irregularly, but following the end of the war it began to be published five times per year. In 1919 Louis Massignon replaced Alfred Le Chatelier as the editor.

Revue du monde musulman was in circulation until 1926. Its successor was Revue des études islamiques which was started in 1927.

References

1906 establishments in France
1926 disestablishments in France
Defunct political magazines published in France
French-language magazines
Magazines established in 1906
Magazines disestablished in 1926
Magazines published in Paris